Anna Kulíšková, married Pešková is a Czech para-alpine skier, who competes in the visual impairment disability class. She won a silver and a bronze medal in the Super-G events at the 2006 and 2010 Winter Paralympics, respectively.

Career
Kulíšková has experienced visual impairment from birth, with her only able to see a four degrees through tunnel vision. She later explained that this limited ability to see means that she could read books and enable her to study. While as a child, she competed in a variety of sports at the national Sports Games of Visually Impaired Youth. Following this she took up cross-country skiing, and then para-alpine skiing after discovering that downhill skiing was a possibility.

She first competed at the Winter Paralympics in the 2006 at Turin, Italy. She placed second in the Super-G, winning the silver medal. She also competed in the giant slalom, where she finished in fourth position outside of the podium places. Kulíšková competed once again at the Paralympics at the 2010 Games in Vancouver, Canada. This time she won the bronze medal in the Super-G competition for visually impaired athletes. It was the only medal won by an athlete from the Czech Republic at the 2010 Winter Paralympics.

After graduating with a bachelor's degree from the Faculty of Social Sciences at Charles University in Prague, Kulíšková moved to Vancouver. She found getting accommodation difficult, as she needed to live somewhere that would allow her to keep a guide dog. While there, she undertook lessons to improve her understanding of the English language. Outside of sports, she was seeking a career in journalism.

After returning from Canada, she got married and in 2016 gave birth to twin babies. Then she came back to alpine skiing. She participated at the 2018 Paralympics in Pyeongchang, where she stood 11th in super-G and did not finish two other races.

References

Living people
Alpine skiers at the 2006 Winter Paralympics
Alpine skiers at the 2010 Winter Paralympics
Charles University alumni
Paralympic athletes of the Czech Republic
Paralympic silver medalists for the Czech Republic
Paralympic bronze medalists for the Czech Republic
Visually impaired category Paralympic competitors
Medalists at the 2006 Winter Paralympics
Medalists at the 2010 Winter Paralympics
Paralympic medalists in alpine skiing
Paralympic alpine skiers of the Czech Republic
1986 births
Sportspeople from Plzeň
20th-century Czech women
21st-century Czech women
Blind people
Czech people with disabilities